is a railway station in the city of Shirakawa, Fukushima Prefecture, Japan, operated by East Japan Railway Company (JR East).

Lines
Shirasaka Station is served by the Tōhoku Main Line, and is located 182.0 rail kilometers from the official starting point of the line at Tokyo Station.

Station layout
The station has two opposed side platforms connected to the station building by a footbridge. The station is unattended.

Platforms

History
Shirasaka Station opened on February 20, 1917. The station was absorbed into the JR East network upon the privatization of the Japanese National Railways (JNR) on April 1, 1987.

Surrounding area
 Shirasaka Post Office
Shirasaka Industrial Park

See also
 List of Railway Stations in Japan

External links

  

Stations of East Japan Railway Company
Railway stations in Fukushima Prefecture
Tōhoku Main Line
Railway stations in Japan opened in 1917
Shirakawa, Fukushima